Willis High School is a public senior high school in Conroe, Texas, with a Willis postal address. It is a part of the Willis Independent School District.

History

In 2004 the school had about 1,440 students.
Ben Cooper was the principal until 2006. That year, Tim Patton became the principal. On June 10, 2010, he was reassigned to a position in the district's headquarters. After a local drag queen was invited as a guest speaker for a cosmetology class, community backlash resulted in more stringent regulations regarding school speakers.

Demographics
In the 2018–2019 school year, there were 2,090 students enrolled at Willis High School. The ethnic distribution of students was as follows:
 
 7.8% African American
 36.5% Hispanic
 51.4% White
 0.7% Asian
 0.3% American Indian
 0.1% Native Hawaiian/Pacific Islander
 3.3% Two or More Races

54.3% of students were eligible for free or reduced-price lunch. The school received Title I funding.

Academics
For each academic year, the Texas Education Agency rates school performance using an A–F grading system based on statistical data. For 2018–2019, the school received a score of 81 out of 100, resulting in a B grade. The school received a score of 71 the previous year.

Programs
The district offers a "Kats at Night" (KAN) night school program. The State of Texas provided a $80,000 grant to Willis ISD to establish the program. The first students graduated in October 2004.

Athletics

Danny Freeman served as the varsity baseball team coach until 2000, when he became the American football defense coordinator at Montgomery High School.

Rick Cullum served as the head American football coach until May 2006. Mack Malone, who was already a part of the athletic staff, replaced him as coach. By 2007 the school was looking for a new coach, and Malone was given a new job.

As of 2004 Amanda Bussell served as the varsity softball coach; she graduated from Oak Ridge High School and previously was an assistant at Montgomery High School.

For UIL events, Willis High school will compete in class 6A, the classification for the largest schools, for the 2020–2022 cycle. The school was only three students above the threshold for entering class 6A. For athletics, the school will compete in District 13 with five Conroe ISD schools as part of the smallest 6A district in Texas.

References

External links
 Willis High School
 

Conroe, Texas
Public high schools in Texas
High schools in Montgomery County, Texas